Tintagel was an electoral division of Cornwall in the United Kingdom which returned one member to sit on Cornwall Council between 2009 and 2021. It was abolished at the 2021 local elections, being succeeded by St Teath and Tintagel and Camelford and Boscastle.

Councillors

Extent
Tintagel represented the villages of Tintagel, Boscastle, Bossiney, Warbstow, Otterham and Treknow, and the hamlets of Treven, Trewarmett, Trebarwith, Penpethy, Halgabron, Trevillet, Lesnewth, Tresparrett, Marshgate and part of Slaughterbridge. The division was affected by boundary changes at the 2013 election. From 2009 to 2013, the division covered 9,432 hectares in total; after the boundary changes in 2013, it covered 9,000 hectares.

Election results

2017 election

2013 election

2009 election

References

Electoral divisions of Cornwall Council
Tintagel